Choqa Safar (also Romanized as Choqā Şafar) is a village in Mahidasht Rural District, Mahidasht District, Kermanshah County, Kermanshah Province, Iran. At the 2006 census, its population was 236, in 52 families.

References 

Populated places in Kermanshah County